Telmatobius pisanoi is a species of frog in the family Telmatobiidae.
It is endemic to Argentina.
Its natural habitats are rivers and swampland.
It is threatened by habitat loss.

References

pisanoi
Amphibians of the Andes
Amphibians of Argentina
Endemic fauna of Argentina
Taxa named by Raymond Laurent
Amphibians described in 1977
Taxonomy articles created by Polbot